Not for Sale is the first solo mixtape by Ugandan recording artist and record producer Flex D'Paper. A follow-up to Eviction Notice mixtape by Rapaholix in 2012 that had songs from Flex and fellow members. Not For Sale was released on 27 June 2017 by his imprint Rapaholix Music on the TheTribe Ug website, a popular hip hop platform online in Uganda.

Background and promotion
Flex D'Paper describes the project in three ways. In an interview with TheTribeUg, he talked about naming the mixtape Not For Sale because the project was going to be free online for his fans.
He emphasised how he had delayed to release a project and so this was a free one, to make up for that time the fans didn't get an album or mixtape from him.
Days before releasing the mixtape, Flex D'Paper revealed it was also titled Not For Sale, as a dedication to victims of human trafficking as well as a dedication to victims of land wrangles, a common struggle in Uganda.
The mixtape was supported by the single "Yenze Aliko", a Luganda slang that means "I Am what's on", a song produced by Mio Made, and mixed by Sam Lamara.

Track listing

Release history

Awards 
Mixtape of the Year - UG Hip Hop Awards 2017

References

2017 mixtape albums